The Albanese ministry is the 73rd ministry of the Government of Australia. It is led by the country's 31st Prime Minister, Anthony Albanese. The Albanese ministry succeeded the second Morrison ministry, which resigned on 23 May 2022 following the federal election that took place on 21 May which saw Labor defeat Scott Morrison's Liberal–National Coalition.

Although counting was still underway on election night, most media outlets projected that due to severe losses by Morrison's Liberal/National Coalition, Labor was the only party that could realistically form even a minority government. Accordingly, Morrison conceded defeat to Albanese late on election night. Soon afterward, in accordance with longstanding Australian constitutional practice, he advised the Governor-General, David Hurley, that he was no longer in a position to govern. Normally, Morrison would have stayed on as caretaker Prime Minister until the final results were known. However, with the Quadrilateral Security Dialogue due to be held on 24 May 2022, Albanese advised Hurley that he could form a government. Hurley then swore in Albanese and four senior Labor frontbenchers as an interim five-person ministry on 23 May, two days after the election. According to ABC News, Hurley would not have invited Albanese to form a government without assurances that Labor could provide stable government, as well as legal advice that this was the proper course of action. According to the Australian Financial Review, Albanese had secured enough support from crossbenchers to be able to govern in the event Labor fell short of a majority. On 30 May 2022, Australian media outlets projected that Labor had won enough seats in the House of Representatives to become a majority government.

After the swearing-in of the interim arrangement, during his first press conference as prime minister, Albanese announced that his full ministry would be sworn in on 1 June 2022. The members of the ministry were announced on 31 May and sworn in the following day. As Labor frontbenchers Kristina Keneally and Terri Butler lost their seats in the election, Clare O'Neil and Murray Watt were chosen by the caucus as replacements to the cabinet.

Current arrangement 
Albanese announced the composition of the full ministry on 31 May 2022. The ministry was sworn in on 1 June 2022.

Cabinet

Outer ministry

Assistant ministry

Special envoys  
Special envoys are additional roles that not part of the ministry, but have been included here because of their status.

Initial arrangement 
In the interim five-person ministry sworn in on 23 May 2022, Albanese was sworn in as Prime Minister, Labor deputy leader Richard Marles as Deputy Prime Minister and Minister for Employment, Jim Chalmers as Treasurer, Senator Penny Wong as Minister for Foreign Affairs, and Senator Katy Gallagher as Minister for Finance, Minister for Women, Attorney-General, and Vice-President of the Executive Council. Gallagher would only hold the position of attorney-general for the duration of the interim ministry. The interim ministry would also cover all other portfolios and the sworn-in ministers would be acting ministers for those portfolios. For example, Gallagher and Chalmers were also acting health minister and interim home affairs minister respectively.

Geographical breakdown
Geographic breakdown of the current ministry, per House of Representatives electorate and state/territory represented in the Senate:

See also
 2022 Australian federal election
 Albanese government

Notes

References

Ministries of Elizabeth II
Ministries of Charles III
2022 establishments in Australia
2022 in Australian politics
Albanese
Albanese
Cabinets established in 2022
Government of Australia
History of Australia (1945–present)
Australian Labor Party
Lists of current office-holders in Australia
Albanese Government
Anthony Albanese
Current governments